The Auto Union 1000 Sp is a sports car produced by Auto Union beginning in 1958. It was equipped with a 981cc two-stroke 3-cylinder engine producing . 5,000 coupes and 1,640 convertibles were produced between 1958 and 1965. In 1959, 50 models were produced with a 1,280cc two-stroke V6 engine. The car takes strong styling cues from the Ford Thunderbird.

Gallery

Technical specifications

See also 
Ford Thunderbird

References 

Auto Union
Mid-size cars
Executive cars
Coupés
Front-wheel-drive vehicles
Cars introduced in 1958
1960s cars